The Big Switch is a 1968 British crime film directed, written and produced by Pete Walker and starring Sebastian Breaks, Virginia Wetherell and Jack Allen.

Plot
Playboy John Carter is implicated in the murder of a blonde from a discotheque and is forced by gangsters into posing for pornographic photographs.

Cast
 Sebastian Breaks as John Carter 
 Virginia Wetherell as Karen 
 Jack Allen as Hornsby-Smith 
 Derek Aylward as Karl Mendez 
 Erika Raffael as Samantha 
 Douglas Blackwell as Bruno Miglio 
 Julie Shaw as Cathy 
 Jane Howard as Jane 
 Roy Sone as Al 
 Nicholas Hawtrey as Gerry 
 Brian Weske as Mike 
 Gilly Grant as Sally 
 Desmond Cullum-Jones as Chief Inspector
 Tracey Yorke as 1st Stripper
 Lena Ellis as 2nd Stripper

Production

Shooting
It was shot on location in Brighton.

Music
The music was composed and conducted by Harry South.

References

Bibliography
 Brian McFarlane & Anthony Slide. The Encyclopedia of British Film. Methuen, 2003.

External links

1968 films
British crime films
British black-and-white films
1968 crime films
Films set in Brighton and Hove
Films directed by Pete Walker
1960s English-language films
1960s British films